In mathematics, a symplectic matrix is a  matrix  with real entries that satisfies the condition

This definition can be extended to  matrices with entries in other fields, such as the complex numbers, finite fields, p-adic numbers, and function fields.

Typically  is chosen to be the block matrix

where  is the  identity matrix.

Properties

Generators for symplectic matrices 
Every symplectic matrix has determinant , and the  symplectic matrices with real entries form a subgroup of the general linear group  under matrix multiplication since being symplectic is a property stable under matrix multiplication. Topologically, this symplectic group is a connected noncompact real Lie group of real dimension , and is denoted . The symplectic group can be defined as the set of linear transformations that preserve the symplectic form of a real symplectic vector space.

This symplectic group has a distinguished set of generators, which can be used to find all possible symplectic matrices. This includes the following sets

where  is the set of  symmetric matrices. Then,  is generated by the setp. 2

of matrices.

Inverse matrix 
Every symplectic matrix is invertible with the inverse matrix given by

Furthermore, the product of two symplectic matrices is, again, a symplectic matrix. This gives the set of all symplectic matrices the structure of a group. There exists a natural manifold structure on this group which makes it into a (real or complex) Lie group called the symplectic group.

Determinantal properties 
It follows easily from the definition that the determinant of any symplectic matrix is ±1. Actually, it turns out that the determinant is always +1 for any field. One way to see this is through the use of the Pfaffian and the identity

Since  and  we have that .

When the underlying field is real or complex, one can also show this by factoring the inequality .

Block form of symplectic matrices 
Suppose Ω is given in the standard form and let  be a  block matrix given by

where  are  matrices. Thus a  matrix is symplectic iff it has unit determinant.

Inverse matrix of block matrix 

The group has dimension . This can be seen by noting that  is anti-symmetric.

Symplectic transformations

In the abstract formulation of linear algebra, matrices are replaced with linear transformations of finite-dimensional vector spaces. The abstract analog of a symplectic matrix is a symplectic transformation of a symplectic vector space. Briefly, a symplectic vector space  is a -dimensional vector space  equipped with a nondegenerate, skew-symmetric bilinear form  called the symplectic form.

A symplectic transformation is then a linear transformation  which preserves , i.e.

The condition that  be a symplectic transformation is precisely the condition that M be a symplectic matrix:

Under a change of basis, represented by a matrix A, we have

One can always bring  to either the standard form given in the introduction or the block diagonal form described below by a suitable choice of A.

The matrix Ω
Symplectic matrices are defined relative to a fixed nonsingular, skew-symmetric matrix . As explained in the previous section,  can be thought of as the coordinate representation of a nondegenerate skew-symmetric bilinear form. It is a basic result in linear algebra that any two such matrices differ from each other by a change of basis.

The most common alternative to the standard  given above is the block diagonal form

This choice differs from the previous one by a permutation of basis vectors.

This is a particularly unfortunate choice as it leads to confusion with the notion of a complex structure, which often has the same coordinate expression as  but represents a very different structure.

where  is the metric. That  and  usually have the same coordinate expression (up to an overall sign) is simply a consequence of the fact that the metric g is usually the identity matrix.

Diagonalisation and decomposition
For any positive definite symmetric real symplectic matrix  there exists  in  such that

Any real symplectic matrix  has a polar decomposition of the form:

Any real symplectic matrix can be decomposed as a product of three matrices:
This decomposition is closely related to the singular value decomposition of a matrix and is known as an 'Euler' or 'Bloch-Messiah' decomposition.

Complex matrices

If instead M is a  matrix with complex entries, the definition is not standard throughout the literature.  Many authors  adjust the definition above to

where M* denotes the conjugate transpose of M. In this case, the determinant may not be 1, but will have absolute value 1. In the 2×2 case (n=1), M will be the product of a real symplectic matrix and a complex number of absolute value 1.

Other authors  retain the definition for complex matrices and call matrices satisfying conjugate symplectic.

Applications

Transformations described by symplectic matrices play an important role in quantum optics and in continuous-variable quantum information theory. For instance, symplectic matrices can be used to describe Gaussian (Bogoliubov) transformations of a quantum state of light. In turn, the Bloch-Messiah decomposition means that such an arbitrary Gaussian transformation can be represented as a set of two passive linear-optical interferometers (corresponding to orthogonal matrices O and O' ) intermitted by a layer of active non-linear squeezing transformations (given in terms of the matrix D). In fact, one can circumvent the need for such in-line active squeezing transformations if two-mode squeezed vacuum states are available as a prior resource only.

See also

 Symplectic vector space
 Symplectic group
 Symplectic representation
 Orthogonal matrix
 Unitary matrix
 Hamiltonian mechanics
 Linear complex structure

References

Matrices
Symplectic geometry